Washington Township is one of fourteen townships in Morgan County, Indiana, United States. As of the 2010 census, its population was 17,073 and it contained 7,171 housing units.  The township contains a portion of the Morgan–Monroe State Forest.

History
The Cross School, Grassyfork Fisheries Farm No. 1, and Long Schoolhouse are listed on the National Register of Historic Places.

Geography
The White River defines the township's north border.

Cities, towns, villages
 Martinsville

Unincorporated towns
 Champlin Meadows at 
 Mahalasville at 
 Maxwell at 
 Shelburne at 
 Stines Mill Corner at 
 Taggart Crossing at 
 Willowbrook Estates at  
 Wolff at 
 Woodcrest at 
(This list is based on USGS data and may include former settlements.)

Cemeteries
The township contains these four cemeteries: Hill Dale, Maxwell, Nutter and Williams.

Major highways
 Interstate 69
  Indiana State Road 37
  Indiana State Road 39
  Indiana State Road 44
  Indiana State Road 67
  Indiana State Road 252

Airports and landing strips
 McDaniels Field

Lakes
 Spring Lake

School districts
 Metropolitan School District of Martinsville Schools

Political districts
 Indiana's 4th congressional district
 State House District 47
 State Senate District 37

References
 
 United States Census Bureau 2008 TIGER/Line Shapefiles
 IndianaMap

External links
 Indiana Township Association
 United Township Association of Indiana
 City-Data.com page for Washington Township

Townships in Morgan County, Indiana
Townships in Indiana